Baldwin was a Benedictine abbot and a follower of St. Bernard of Clairvaux. Baldwin, an Italian by birth, entered the Clairvaux Monastery in France. Later in life Baldwin was assigned to Italy as abbot of San Pastore, near Rieti. There he remained until his death in 1140. He is patron saint of Rieti.

Notes

French Roman Catholic saints
12th-century Christian saints
1140 deaths
French Benedictines
Italian Benedictines
Italian Roman Catholic saints
Year of birth unknown